Cimei Township (Qimei Township, Chimei Township) is a rural township in Penghu County, Taiwan. The island is the fifth largest in the Pescadores (Penghu) and the southernmost island in the group. It is the smallest township in Penghu County.

History
Archaeological evidence of prehistoric cultures dating back 4500 years before present was found in Nangang Village in 1983. There were residents on the island during the Ming dynasty.

The island came under Qing control in 1683 after the Battle of Penghu. In the early Qing, the island was known as "South Island" and "Southern Big Island". The residents of the island were moved to nearby Wang-an and the island was declared permanently off-limits for human habitation. The oldest temple on the island was established in 1706. By the end of the Qing period, the island was generally referred to as "Big Island" (Ta Yu). The island was ceded to Japan in 1895.

Japan took control of the area during the Pescadores Campaign (1895). During Japanese rule, the island was a She「社」 under Mōan 「望安庄」 (today's Wang-an) called Ō-shima「大嶼」. The Qimei Lighthouse (Cimei Lighthouse) was constructed in 1939, the final lighthouse built in Taiwan during Japanese rule.

The handover of Taiwan to the Republic of China occurred in 1945. Ta hsü Township (Dayu) was established on December 11, 1945. The island and township were renamed "Chimei/Cimei/Qimei" in 1949 to commemorate a legend (七美人塚) from the Ming dynasty, in which seven women committed suicide when pirates raided the island. 

In 1966, President Chiang Kai-shek conducted an inspection of the island.

In 1986, Cimei was severely affected by Typhoon Wayne.

On April 20, 2002, President Chen Shui-bian visited the island and delivered remarks on healthcare services in the area.

On October 24, 2019 at around 8 AM, two sand smuggling ships from China with a total crew of twenty-eight were apprehended in the waters southwest of the township.

Geography

Cimei is 6.99 km2 in area with a coastline of 14.4 kilometers and with about 3,909 people. Composed mostly of basalt formations, the island is the fifth largest island in the Penghu Archipelago.

Infrastructure

 Qimei Power Plant
 Qimei Reservoir

Administrative divisions
The township includes six rural villages:
 Donghu/Tunghu Village
 Sihu/Xihu Village
 Jhonghe/Zhonghe Village
 Pinghe Village
 Haifong/Haifeng Village
 Nangang Village

Tourist attractions
 Double-Heart of Stacked Stones
 Little Taiwan
 Qimei Lighthouse

Transportation

 Qimei Airport

See also
 List of islands of the Republic of China
 Wang-an

References

External links

 Qimei Township Government website 
  The location of Qimei in Penghu County
 【澎湖縣政新聞】七美鄉公所行政大樓 落成啟用 ('Penghu County Government News- Cimei Township Hall Completed') 

Townships in Penghu County